Sanjay Prasad Yadav is an Indian politician and a member of Jharkhand Legislative Assembly of India. He represents the Godda constituency in the Godda district of Jharkhand. He was elected in 2009 as a member of Rashtriya Janata Dal and 2019 Jharkhand Legislative Assembly. He also contested from this constituency but lost to Amit Kumar Mandal by very short margin.

References

Living people
Rashtriya Janata Dal politicians
Members of the Jharkhand Legislative Assembly
People from Godda district
Jharkhand MLAs 2009–2014
Jharkhand politicians by Rashtriya Janata Dal
Year of birth missing (living people)